The Winning Stroke is a lost 1919 silent American college drama film directed by Edward Dillon and starring George Walsh, a former Olympic athlete. Some filming took place at Yale University. The film was produced and distributed by Fox Film Corporation.

Cast
George Walsh as Buck Simmons
Jane McAlpine as Aida Courtlandt
John Leslie as Paul Browning
William T. Hayes as Burton Hampdon
Louis Este as 'Crickett' Perry
John Woodford as The Dean (credited as Mr. Woodford)
Sidney Marion as 'Chub' Winters
Byron Douglas as The Head Coach
Julien Beaubien as Undetermined Role

See also
1937 Fox vault fire

References

External links

1919 films
American silent feature films
Lost American films
Fox Film films
Films directed by Edward Dillon
American black-and-white films
Silent American drama films
1919 drama films
1919 lost films
Lost drama films
1910s American films